Bitto is a Hindi language Indian television drama series which premiered on 17 May 2010 on Sahara One. The series is produced by Abhimanyu Singh of Contiloe Entertainment and the story focuses on the prevalent caste-based discrimination in the state of Uttar Pradesh.

Plot
This story revolves around an innocent girl with a life full of hardships. It discovers Bitto's journey of life.

Cast
 Pallavi Gupta as Bitto
 Ajay Kumar Nain as Bitto's Husband
 Vandana Lalwani as Rajjo
 Mandar Jadhav as jai
 Vaquar Shaikh as Thakur Pratap Singh
 Pallavi Rao as Sugandha
 Kamalika Guha Thakurta

References

Indian television soap operas
Sahara One original programming
Indian drama television series
2010 Indian television series debuts
2011 Indian television series endings
Television shows set in Uttar Pradesh